"Girls Just Want to Have Fun" is a song written, recorded and performed by American musician Robert Hazard, who released it as a single in 1979. It is best known for the version of American singer Cyndi Lauper, who covered the song in 1983. It was the first major single released by Lauper as a solo artist and the lead single from her debut studio album, She's So Unusual (1983). Lauper's version gained recognition as a feminist anthem and was promoted by a Grammy-winning music video. It has been covered, either as a studio recording or in a live performance, by over 30 other artists.

The single was Lauper's breakthrough hit, reaching  2 on the US Billboard Hot 100 chart and becoming a worldwide hit throughout late 1983 and early 1984. It is considered one of Lauper's signature songs and was a widely popular song during the 1980s. The "Rolling Stone & MTV: '100 Greatest Pop Songs': 1–50", "Rolling Stone: "The 100 Top Music Videos"" and the "VH1: 100 Greatest Videos" lists ranked the song at No. 22, No. 39 and No. 45, respectively. The song received Grammy Award nominations for Record of the Year and Best Female Pop Vocal Performance. In 2013, the song was remixed by Yolanda Be Cool, taken from the 30th anniversary reissue of She's So Unusual.

Background
The song was written by Robert Hazard, who recorded a demo of it in 1979. Hazard wrote the song from a male point of view. Lauper's version appeared on her 1983 debut solo record She's So Unusual. Lauper changed some of the lyrics at the suggestion of her producer and she also had her own suggestions about how her version should sound. The track is a synthesizer-backed anthem, from a feminist perspective, conveying the point that all women really want is to have the same experiences that men can. Gillian G. Gaar, author of She's a Rebel: The History of Women in Rock & Roll (2002), described the single and corresponding video as a "strong feminist statement", an "anthem of female solidarity" and a "playful romp celebrating female camaraderie."

Reception
Cash Box said that "Robert Hazard’s original male point of view is transformed into a cheerleader-like sing-along for party girls, and the Toni Basil-like beat is augmented by a hooky, ringing guitar."

Chart performance
The song was released in late 1983 but much of its success on the charts came during the first half of 1984. The single reached the Top 10 in over 25 countries and reached No. 1 in ten of those countries including Australia, Brazil, Canada, Ireland, Japan, New Zealand, and Norway. It also reached No. 2 in both the United Kingdom and the United States.

In the United States, the song entered the Billboard Hot 100 at No. 80 on December 17, 1983. It ultimately peaked at No. 2 on March 10, 1984, where it stayed for two weeks, behind Van Halen's "Jump". In the United Kingdom, the song entered the chart at No. 50 on January 14, 1984, and peaked at No. 2 on February 4, 1984, where it stayed for one week. In Ireland, the song entered the chart on January 29, 1984. It peaked at No. 1 for two weeks and was on the chart for a total of seven weeks. In Australia, the song debuted on the Kent Music Report Top 100 on February 27, 1984. It entered the Top 10 in only its third week on the chart and reached No. 1 on March 26, 1984. It topped the chart for two weeks and then remained at No. 2 for four weeks behind Nena's "99 Luftballons". It stayed on the chart for 21 weeks and was the 9th biggest-selling single of the year. In Belgium, the song debut at No. 38 on February 18, 1984, and peaked at No. 4 on April 7, 1984. In the Netherlands, the song entered the chart at No. 38 on February 25, 1984, and peaked at No. 4 on March 31, 1984.

In Sweden, the song entered at No. 13 on March 6, 1984, and peaked at No. 5 on April 3, 1984, charting for six weeks. In Switzerland, the song entered the chart at No. 15 on April 1, 1984, and peaked at No. 6 on April 29, 1984. In New Zealand, the song debuted at No. 21 on April 1, 1984, and peaked at No. 1 on May 6, 1984, where it stayed for three weeks. In Austria, the single entered at No. 3 on May 1, 1984, which was its peak position.

Music video

The release of the single was accompanied by a quirky music video. It cost less than $35,000, largely due to a volunteer cast and the free loan of the most sophisticated video equipment available at the time. The cast included Lauper's close friend, professional wrestler/manager "Captain" Lou Albano in the role of Lauper's father while her real mother, Catrine, played herself. Lauper later appeared in World Wrestling Federation storylines opposite Albano and guest-starred in an episode of The Super Mario Bros. Super Show!, in which Albano portrayed Mario (Albano also played himself in the episode). This collaboration was the catalyst for the "Rock 'n' Wrestling" connection that lasted for the following two years. Lauper's attorney, Elliot Hoffman, appeared as her uptight dancing partner. Also in the cast were Lauper's manager, David Wolf, her brother, Butch Lauper, fellow musician Steve Forbert, and a bevy of secretaries borrowed from Portrait/CBS, Lauper's record label. A clip of The Hunchback of Notre Dame is featured as Lauper watches it on television.

Saturday Night Live creator Lorne Michaels, another of Hoffman's clients, agreed to give Lauper free run of his brand new million-dollar digital editing equipment, with which she and her producer created several first-time-ever computer-generated images of Lauper dancing with her buttoned-up lawyer, leading the entire cast in a snake-dance through New York streets and ending up in Lauper's bedroom in her home. The bedroom scene is an homage to the famous stateroom scene in the Marx Brothers' film A Night at the Opera.

"The year 1983 makes a watershed in the history of female-address video. It is the year that certain issues and representations began to gain saliency and the textual strategies of female address began to coalesce." In the video, Lauper wanted to show in a more fun and light-hearted manner that girls want the same equality and recognition boys had in society.

Before the song starts, the beginning of her version of "He's So Unusual" plays.

The music video was directed by Edd Griles. The producer was Ken Walz while the cinematographer was Francis Kenny. The treatment for the video was co-written by Griles, Walz, and Lauper. The video was shot in the Lower East Side of Manhattan in summer 1983 and premiered on television in December 1983.
The choreography was by a New York dance and music troupe called XXY featuring Mary Ellen Strom, Cyndi Lee and Pierce Turner.

The music video officially crossed one billion views on YouTube in January 2022.

Awards and Nominations

Accolades

Awards and nominations

|-
|rowspan="1"|1983
|rowspan="9"|"Girls Just Want to Have Fun"
|American Video Awards for Best Female Performance
|
|-
|rowspan="6"|1984
|MTV Video Music Award for Video of the Year
|
|-
|MTV Video Music Award for Best New Artist
|
|-
|MTV Video Music Award for Best Female Video
|
|-
|MTV Video Music Award for Best Concept Video
|
|-
|MTV Video Music Award – Viewer's Choice
|
|-
|MTV Video Music Award for Best Overall Performance
|
|-
|rowspan="2"| 1985 || Grammy Award for Record of the Year || 
|-
| Grammy Award for Best Female Pop Vocal Performance ||

Track listings
 7-inch single
A. "Girls Just Want to Have Fun" – 3:55 (R. Hazard)
B. "Right Track Wrong Train" – 4:40 (C. Lauper, E. Greenwich, J. Kent)

 12-inch single
A. "Girls Just Want to Have Fun (Extended Version)" – 6:08
B1. "Fun With V. Knutsn (Instrumental)" – 7:10
B2. "Xtra Fun" – 5:05

 Single
A CD single was issued in 2007, known as a ringle, which included bonus interactive computer material as well as a code to download a free ringtone of the title track. It featured the title track and for the first time on CD, "Right Track Wrong Train". The ringle, as well as all other issued ringles, were recalled by Sony Music due to issues with the ringtone not working correctly. They have yet to be reissued.
 "Girls Just Want to Have Fun"
 "Right Track Wrong Train"
 Computer media

Credits and personnel

Lyrics: Robert Hazard. Production: Rick Chertoff.
Lyrics: Cyndi Lauper, Ellie Greenwich, Jeffrey B. Kent. Production: Rick Chertoff

 Cyndi Lauper – lead vocals, background vocals
 Jules Shear – backing vocals
 Ellie Greenwich – backing vocals
 Eric Bazilian – bass
 Krystal Davis – backing vocals
 Rick DiFonzo – electric guitar
 Anton Fig – LinnDrum and Oberheim DX
 Rob Hyman – keyboards, Roland Juno-60, synthesizers
 Maretha Stewart – backing vocals
 Diane Wilson – backing vocals

Charts

Weekly charts

Year-end charts

Certifications

"Hey Now (Girls Just Want to Have Fun)"

"Hey Now (Girls Just Want to Have Fun)" was released as the first single from Cyndi Lauper's first compilation album, Twelve Deadly Cyns...and Then Some (1994), and it was also her first charting single on the Billboard Hot 100 since "My First Night Without You" in 1989. The single was issued in the United Kingdom on September 5, 1994.

This song is a new reggae-tinged arrangement of Lauper's own "Girls Just Want to Have Fun" standard, with a musical tip of the hat to Redbone's "Come and Get Your Love". The arrangement evolved as she experimented with the song's style over the course of the 1993–1994 Hat Full of Stars Tour. The song was a big comeback hit for Lauper, landing in the top 10 and top 40 in several countries. It was also a sizeable dance hit in the United States. It peaked at No. 4 in the UK and New Zealand, its highest position.

Critical reception
Steve Baltin from Cash Box noted that the "reggae-flavored dance oriented remake" is being given a big boost from the film To Wong Foo, Thanks For Everything, Julie Newmar. He added, "Lauper still sounds in fine form on the very easy going kick-back track. Particularly fun is the jammin’ guitar solo bridge in the middle of the single." In his weekly UK chart commentary, James Masterton said, "The new version slows the track down to turn it into a far slinkier dance groove to quite inspired effect". Alan Jones from Music Week wrote, "Turning a familiar old favourite into a dance groove unusually required a drop in tempo here, reducing it to a slinky shuffle. The melody and Cyndi's excellent vocals are still its selling points, and the success of Cyndi's Twelve Deadly Cyns album suggests the timing could be right to make this a hit again."

Music video
A music video was produced to promote the new version, directed by Cyndi Lauper herself and later published on YouTube in September 2010. It has amassed more than 4.2 million views as of December 2022.

Track listings
 European CD Single / UK Cassette Single
 "Hey Now (Girls Just Want to Have Fun)" (Single Edit) – 3:39
 "Hat Full of Stars" – 4:27

 CD single (US/UK) / European CD Maxi-Single
 "Hey Now (Girls Just Want to Have Fun)" (Single Edit) – 3:39
 "Hey Now (Girls Just Want to Have Fun)" (Mickey Bennett's Carnival Version featuring Patra) (Edit) – 4:09
 "Hey Now (Girls Just Want to Have Fun)" (Sly & Robbie's Home Grown Version featuring Snow) – 4:16
 "Hey Now (Girls Just Want to Have Fun)" (Vasquez Remix Pop Goes the Dancehall featuring Snow) – 5:04
 "Girls Just Want to Have Fun" (Original Version) – 3:54

 Japanese CD single
 "Hey Now (Girls Just Want to Have Fun)" (Single Edit) – 3:39
 "Hey Now (Girls Just Want to Have Fun)" (Mickey Bennett's Carnival Version featuring Patra) (Edit) – 4:09
 "Hey Now (Girls Just Want to Have Fun)" (Sly & Robbie's Home Grown Version featuring Snow) – 4:16
 "Hey Now (Girls Just Want to Have Fun)" (Vasquez Remix Pop Goes the Dancehall featuring Snow) – 5:04

 Australian CD single
 "Hey Now (Girls Just Want to Have Fun)" (Single Edit) – 3:39
 "Hey Now (Girls Just Want to Have Fun)" (Vasquez Remix Pop Goes the Dancehall featuring Snow) – 5:04
 "Hey Now (Girls Just Want to Have Fun)" (Vasquez Remix Dancehall Main featuring Snow) – 5:50
 "Hey Now (Girls Just Want to Have Fun)" (Vasquez Remix Harder Dancehall featuring Snow) – 5:49
 "Hey Now (Girls Just Want to Have Fun)" (Sly & Robbie's Home Grown Version featuring Snow) – 4:16
 "Hey Now (Girls Just Want to Have Fun)" (Vasquez Lounge Mix featuring Snow) – 6:12
 "Hey Now (Girls Just Want to Have Fun)" (Mickey Bennett's Carnival Version featuring Patra) (Edit) – 4:09

 European 12-inch
 "Hey Now (Girls Just Want to Have Fun)" (Vasquez Remix Pop Goes the Dancehall featuring Snow) – 5:04
 "Hey Now (Girls Just Want to Have Fun)" (Vasquez Remix Dancehall Main featuring Snow) – 5:50
 "Hey Now (Girls Just Want to Have Fun)" (Vasquez Remix Harder Dancehall featuring Snow) – 5:49
 "Hey Now (Girls Just Want to Have Fun)" (Sly & Robbie's Home Grown Version featuring Snow) – 4:16
 "Hey Now (Girls Just Want to Have Fun)" (Vasquez Lounge Mix featuring Snow) – 6:12
 "Hey Now (Girls Just Want to Have Fun)" (Vasquez Lounge Dub featuring Snow) – 6:00
 "Hey Now (Girls Just Want to Have Fun)" (Mickey Bennett's Carnival Version featuring Patra) – 6:00

Charts

Weekly charts

Year-end charts

Certifications

Race for Life version

In 2010, Cancer Research UK arranged for a charity record for their Race for Life campaign. It features many celebrities such as EastEnders actress Nina Wadia, Coronation Street actress Kym Marsh, Life of Riley actress Caroline Quentin, glamour girl Danielle Lloyd, X Factor finalist Lucie Jones, singer Sonique (herself a breast cancer survivor), former EastEnders actress Lucy Benjamin, and Celebrity Big Brothers Nicola T. The single was released on April 26, 2010. The physical edition was exclusively distributed to over eight hundred stores run by Tesco, an official partner of the event series. The digital edition was released on iTunes. The sales were to be used for cancer research. This version would chart at No.107.

Parodies
 "Weird Al" Yankovic scored a hit with his parody version called "Girls Just Want to Have Lunch" from his 1985 album Dare to Be Stupid.
 On Sesame Street, Oscar the Grouch, Grundgetta and a couple other Grouch girls sang a parody of the song, "Grouch Girls Don't Wanna Have Fun".

See also
 1983 in music
 List of number-one dance singles of 1984 (U.S.)
 Wanna Have Fun

References

External links

 
 

1979 songs
1983 debut singles
1994 singles
2008 singles
Cashbox number-one singles
CBS Records singles
Columbia Records singles
Cyndi Lauper songs
Epic Records singles
European Hot 100 Singles number-one singles
Irish Singles Chart number-one singles
Miley Cyrus songs
MTV Video Music Award for Best Female Video
Number-one singles in Australia
Number-one singles in Israel
Number-one singles in New Zealand
Number-one singles in Norway
Portrait Records singles
Robert Hazard songs
Song recordings produced by Rick Chertoff
Songs with feminist themes
Songs written by Robert Hazard